KFRC (610 AM) was a radio station in San Francisco, California, United States, which made its first broadcast on Wednesday, September 24, 1924, from studios in the Hotel Whitcomb, at 1231 Market Street. KFRC originally broadcast with 50 watts on the 270 meter wavelength (equal to about 1110 kHz), then moved to 660 kHz in April 1927. As part of nationwide frequency reallocations on November 11, 1928, KFRC was moved to 610 kHz, where the call letters remained until 2005.

In addition, KFRC had a co-owned FM sister station, known as KFRC-FM, which operated on 106.1 MHz in the 1970s, and later began simulcasting on 99.7 MHz in 1991, and its format continued on 99.7 FM for a time even after the AM station was sold. The KFRC call sign was moved to KFRC-FM 106.9 on May 17, 2007. The famous callsign letters were sequentially issued, as was common when KFRC signed on the air in 1924. They did not stand for "Francisco" or "Frisco," nor did they stand for "Known For Radio Clearness," though this was the slogan used when the station first signed on with 50 watts of power. Broadcasts had been heard over a much larger area than had been anticipated. Other slogans KFRC used in its early days were "Keep Forever Radiating Cheer," "Keep Freely Radiating Cheer," and "Far Reaching Channel."

Early history
The beginning of KFRC was largely due to the efforts of its first manager, Harrison Holliway. As a child, he was an amateur radio buff, and by 1920, he was operating his own amateur radio station, with the call sign 6BN. For a time, Harrison was on the air every day with 6BN, broadcasting record programs "for the sheer pleasure of it." He also worked as a part-time newspaper reporter, covering high school sporting news for the San Francisco Call.

Beginning in 1920, Holliway attended Stanford University. During the summer of 1924, Holliway was working at a radio shop called the Radio Art Corporation in San Francisco. A Western Electric salesman called on the owners, Jim Threlkeld and Thomas Catton, and sold them on the idea of starting a new radio station (and of course, buying a Western Electric transmitter). So, KFRC was born and Holliway became the manager.

KFRC went on the air on September 24, 1924, with speeches by local dignitaries, followed by a program with concert, symphony and dance orchestras including the Stanislas Bem Little Orchestra, led by Eugenia Argiewicz. Although the signal was only 50 watts, reception proved exceptionally good. It was heard on the U.S. Atlantic Coast, and across the Pacific Ocean as far away as New Zealand.

In the following years, Holliway interviewed such personalities as baseball great Rogers Hornsby, French-Canadian heavyweight boxer Jack Renault, and actors William S. Hart, Douglas Fairbanks, Jr., and John Barrymore. Harry "Mac" McClintock who hosted a daily children's program, later wrote the hit song "Big Rock Candy Mountain."

Don Lee networks
In 1926, KFRC was purchased by Don Lee, who was the wealthy California distributor for Cadillac automobiles. He is said to have had "a personal habit of doing everything in grand style." His family owned the station for 25 years. In 1927, he purchased KHJ in Los Angeles, and in 1929, both stations became affiliated with William S. Paley's Columbia Broadcasting System (CBS).

Meredith Willson made his radio debut on KFRC's Blue Monday Jamboree in 1928. Jack Benny's announcer Don Wilson began his radio career at KFRC. Others included Ralph Edwards, Art Van Horn, and Mark Goodson, who later went on with partner Bill Todman to create many radio and television game and quiz shows. Other personalities associated with KFRC during the Don Lee era were Art Linkletter, Mel Venter, Bea Benaderet, Harold Peary, Morey Amsterdam, Juanita Tennyson, Merv Griffin, and John Nesbitt.

Don Lee died in 1934 and his son took over management. KFRC (and sister station KHJ in Los Angeles) switched to the new Mutual Broadcasting System on December 29, 1936.

1950s and 1960s: Bill Drake era
In 1949, RKO-General acquired KFRC. The format evolved to feature relaxed "air personalities" playing the adult hits of the day (Frank Sinatra, Nat King Cole, Dean Martin, and similar) a format sometimes referred to as Middle Of The Road (MOR). Air personalities included Bob Colvig doing the afternoon-drive show. At times KFRC called itself "Frisco Radio". 1950s KFRC competitors with similar formats included KSFO, KNBC (formerly KPO, later KNBR), KGO and KROW (later KABL). Entering the 1960s, with Top 40 rock and roll radio growing in strength, MOR stations had declining shares of listeners and revenue. Not all of them could survive as MOR.

In February 1966, KFRC flipped to a Top 40 rock and roll music format, and quickly became the dominant station in the region with that format through the 1970s, featuring the tight, carefully programmed sound developed by RKO General's national program director, Bill Drake, formerly of cross-town rival KYA, and program directors Tom Rounds and, later, Les Turpin. It entered its second "golden era," which coincided with San Francisco's Summer of Love, and featured legendary disc jockeys Mike Phillips, Ed Mitchell (who later changed his name to Ed Hepp), Bobby Dale, Jay Stevens, Sebastian Stone, K.O. Bayley (real name Bob Elliott), Dave Diamond, Charlie Van Dyke, Howard Clark, Dale Dorman, Mark Elliott, Frank Terry, Joe Conrad, Jim Carson, J.J. Johnson, and Bob Foster.

During the Drake era, KFRC was responsible for two memorable concerts. The station presented several prominent acts at "The Beach Boys Summer Spectacular" at the Cow Palace in San Francisco in June 1966.  On June 10 and 11, 1967, KFRC organized and hosted the Fantasy Fair and Magic Mountain Music Festival at the summit of Mount Tamalpais in Marin County, California. Occurring one week before the more famous Monterey Pop Festival, the well-attended event is regarded as the first rock festival in history.

For several years, KFRC had extended local newscasts on its AM station, under the leadership of news director Bob Safford; however, management decided to curtail news coverage, so Safford and other news staff moved to other news broadcast departments in San Francisco, including KCBS Radio and KGO-TV.

In the late 1960s, KFRC-FM utilized one of the first computer-operated automation systems in the country.

Annual top 100

On New Year's Eve and New Year's Day, KFRC would count down their top 100 songs of the past year.  Their number one songs, by year, were:

1970s and 1980s: Dr. Don Rose, Magic 61
From 1973 until 1986, Dr. Don Rose (July 5, 1934–March 30, 2005, born Donald D. Rosenberg) was KFRC's morning air radio personality. With earlier experience at WQXI (AM) in Atlanta, Georgia, and WFIL in Philadelphia, he was known for his one-liners and sound effects. One of Rose's characteristic "sound bite" mannerisms around this time period was to state the words "that's right" in a continuous fashion that was intended to sound "crazy", or funny, which also served to represent the overall morning zoo radio format, style and "feel" of his show. Rose revealed in a Risky Business 1980s television interview that he earned in excess of $300K a year, still incredible compensation by today's lackluster radio personality standards.

With Dr. Don as anchor, and a supporting cast that included Bobby Ocean, Rick Shaw, Dave Sholin, Harry Nelson, Terry Nelson, Bay Area Hall of Fame inductee Don Sainte-Johnn, "Marvelous" Mark McKay and John Mack Flanagan, KFRC would be voted "Station of the Year" four times by Billboard Magazine. Rose was considered by many to be the king of radio in the Bay Area during the last decade of AM's musical dominance. KFRC program directors during this period included Michael Spears, Les Garland, Gerry Cagle and Mike Phillips.

KFRC was known for its award-winning news department.  It covered Bay Area news stories with tight writing, use of natural sound, short sound bites, live reports.  It was "news you can dance to."   Some of the best news anchors and reporters worked at KFRC in the '70s and '80s including Jo Interrante, Dave Cooke, Paul Fredricks, John Winters, Conni Gordon, Jeri Stewart, Vikki Liviakis, Robert McCormick, Mike Colgan, Laurie Kaye, Dave MacQueen, Stephen Capen, Mike Sugerman, Ken Bastida, John Evans, Jan Black, Abby Goldman, Joanne Greene, Jane Dornacker, and reporter, anchor and later news director William Abbott.  Known for his unique, confident style, Abbott would end each report with the station's signature, "This is William Abbott, KFRC 20/20 News".

The station began broadcasting in AM stereo in the early 1980s. Among the disc jockeys at KFRC during the 1980s were, in addition to Ocean and Rose, Chuck Geiger, future AT&T Park public-address announcer Renel Brooks-Moon and future Los Angeles radio programmer Jack Silver, who would be the last voice heard when KFRC ended its Top 40 era. Technically, Don Sainte-Johnn was the last air personality on KFRC (with all respect to programmer Jack Silver, who was a manager, not considered air talent for KFRC). Sainte-Johnn had been specifically hired for KFRC as an air personality.

With the decline of the Top 40 format by mid-decade, KFRC's programming was flipped at 6 AM on August 11, 1986, to an adult standards format, and was known as "Magic 61", while still broadcasting in stereo. The last song to be played before the change was "Lights" by Journey, which had also been used in KFRC's TV advertising.

1990s: adding FM
In the 1990s, KFRC changed to a nostalgia format by playing the rock hits of the 1960s and '70s, recreating the successful Bill Drake years.

When, in 1977, KFRC sold off its money-losing FM station at 106.1, programmed by Don Sainte-Johnn (to become KMEL), it soon became clear that the owners had made a mistake.  This was corrected in 1991 with the purchase of KXXX 99.7. This frequency for many years was owned by NBC, and had been KNBR-FM, and later KNAI, and finally KYUU before NBC closed its radio division in 1988. Under KFRC, the FM signal at 99.7 was simulcast with the popular AM station at 610, which began on August 12, 1993. The oldies format proved very successful in the Bay market, reaching number one with the popular 25–54 demo. Sign on line up began after a week long taped segment talking about the history of Bay Area Radio. The first Air Talent line up included Harry Nelson, Chuck Geiger (a mainstay of KXXX), Brian Lee and Jym Dingler in nights. Kevin (Pig virus) Metheny stayed on from KXXX to be the first program Director.   Personalities included Ron Parker and Cammy Blackstone in the mornings, Don "The Sainte" Sainte-Johnn, Sue Hall, Bobby Ocean, Jeff Dean, and Sylvia "Cha Cha" Chacon.  Oldies program directors included Bob Hamilton of KRTH fame, Brian Thomas from 1994 to 2003, Tim Marinville in 2003–04. Bob Harlow became the last PD to play oldies on KFRC.

Sale of KFRC AM
In 2005, the owners, Infinity Broadcasting announced the sale of the AM station, which was anticipated to receive new call letters. The sale price was reported to be $35 million. The oldies format of KFRC AM and FM was scheduled to continue on the FM frequency.

The sale of the AM station came about as a result of the purchase of CBS' Sacramento television affiliate, KOVR, by Viacom, at the time the owner of both CBS and Infinity.  Because KFRC's strong 5,000 watt AM signal from the Berkeley Marina was heard as a local station not only in San Francisco, but in Sacramento as well, the FCC required Infinity to sell either one of its Sacramento stations or a Bay Area station that had Sacramento as part of its city-grade coverage.

Gerry Cagle, who programmed KFRC in the early eighties, and now writes for MusicBiz.com, commented in 2005:

Infinity sold the AM station to Family Stations, the owners of KEAR 106.9 FM, a Christian radio station. Shortly thereafter, Family Stations sold their FM station to Infinity. On April 29, 2005, Family Stations began simulcasting the signal of their FM station on 610 AM. The Oakland Athletics baseball team, which was the only sports tenant the past few years on the AM side, negotiated with Family Stations to have their games broadcast until the end of the 2005 baseball season.

Blocks
During its 1950s/1960s hits format, KFRC had blocks on various days of the week.

Beatles Wednesday- an emphasis on Beatles music, particularly the songs before the release of Help!
Motown Monday- emphasis on artists like The Temptations and The Supremes

Classic Hits KFRC 
On September 5, 2005, KFRC-FM, the only oldies outlet in San Francisco, moved their format ahead ten years switching to a '70s & '80s music format.  The station billed itself as "the Bay Area's Classic Hits".  However, more Oldies from the 1960s had been added in months around this time.

The legendary KFRC call letters left the AM band on October 17, 2005, when the KEAR call letters were transferred from 106.9 FM to 610 AM. Meanwhile, 106.9 FM had become KIFR, an outlet for CBS Radio's new Free FM talk format.

Rhythmic Movin 99.7 KFRC

At 10:03 a.m. on Friday, September 22, 2006, KFRC-FM changed their format to a Rhythmic Hot AC format. Closing off their oldies broadcast with "American Pie", by Don McLean, they changed to "The New Movin' 99.7 KFRC" with Gonna Make You Sweat by C+C Music Factory. The "MOViN'" brand had previously been picked up by KQMV/Seattle, KMVN/Los Angeles, KYMV/Salt Lake City, KMVK/Dallas and WMVN/St. Louis.  The format switch was met with sharp criticism from long time listeners of KFRC because it was the last remaining Oldies station in the region.

KFRC callsign moves to 106.9

On Thursday, May 17, 2007, the KFRC-FM callsign moved to 106.9 FM, when CBS Radio discontinued the Free FM format in San Francisco, and revived the "classic hits" format after the Oakland Athletics vs Kansas City Royals game. 106.9 continued hosting the Oakland Athletics, who were hosted on KFRC 610 AM for several years before it was bought and the A's left it for KYCY 1550 AM and then 106.9 FM. MOViN' 99.7 continues on under the call sign KMVQ-FM.

On October 27, 2008, at 7:40 AM, KCBS 740 AM began simulcasting on 106.9 FM, which still has the call letters KFRC-FM. KFRC-HD2 (on 106.9-2 FM) continues a Classic Hits format: music hits of the 1960s through the 1980s.

Reincarnation at 1550 AM

It was announced on December 22, 2008, that starting on New Year's Day 2009, KYCY 1550 AM would switch to an oldies music format courtesy of Scott Shannon's "The True Oldies Channel" (programmed by ABC Radio), using the KFRC callsign. (In another twist, AM 1550 was KOBY in the late 1950s, playing then-new Top 40 songs that 50 years later KFRC played as oldies.)  This incarnation of KFRC ended on September 1, 2011, when it became Indian-targeted KZDG.

References

External links
The History of KFRC San Francisco and the Don Lee Networks
KFRC switches from oldies to music of 1970s and '80s, from the San Francisco Chronicle
The History of KFRC Radio, from the Bay Area Radio Museum
FCC History Cards for KFRC

FRC
RKO General
Defunct radio stations in the United States
Radio stations established in 1924
1924 establishments in California
2005 disestablishments in California
Radio stations disestablished in 2005
FRC